Staffan Tällberg, born 17 April 1970 in Bollnäs, Sweden, is a Swedish former ski jumper.

Career
His best Winter Olympics was at Calgary in 1988 where he finished seventh in the team large hill and eighth both in the individual normal hill and individual large hill events. He also ended up 2cond in Garmish-Partenkirchen on New Year's Day 1988.

At the FIS Nordic World Ski Championships, Tällberg earned his best finish of fifth in the team large hill event at Lahti in 1989 and his best individual finish of 11th in the individual normal hill event at Val di Fiemme in 1991.

Tällberg's best finish at the Ski-flying World Championships was 16th in 1992 at Harrachov. His lone World Cup competition victory was in a flying hill event in Planica in 1991.

He is the younger brother of Per-Inge Tällberg.

World Cup

Standings

Wins

References

External links

1970 births
Living people
People from Bollnäs
Ski jumpers at the 1988 Winter Olympics
Ski jumpers at the 1992 Winter Olympics
Ski jumpers at the 1994 Winter Olympics
Swedish male ski jumpers
Sportspeople from Gävleborg County